Jordi Bolòs i Masclans (Barcelona, 1955) is Professor of Medieval History at the University of Lleida. Rural Catalan history, urban history and the landscape history (The medieval origins of the Catalan landscape) has focussed his research in the study of the medieval society. He has published several historical atlases of the Carolingian counties of Besalú, Empúries-Peralada, Girona, Osona, Manresa, Urgell and Roussillon, Conflent, Vallespir and Fenouillèdes. Editor of the publication Territori i societat a l’edat mitjana.

Main publications

 , Rafael Dalmau Editor, Barcelona, 1980. .
 , Ketres, Barcelona, 1983 (with J. Nuet). .
 , Generalitat de Catalunya, Barcelona, 1986 (with L. Mallart). .
 , Andorra, 1987(with V. Hurtado). .
 , Lleida, 1993. ISSN 0214-445X.
 , I.E.C, Barcelona, 1994 (with Josep Moran). .
 , Curial, Barcelona, 1995. .
 , Universitat de Lleida, Lleida, 1996. .
 , Angle, Manresa, 1997. .
 , Rafael Dalmau, Barcelona, 1998 (with V. Hurtado). .
 , Rafael Dalmau, Barcelona, 1999 (with V. Hurtado). .
 , Edicions 62, Barcelona, 2000. .
 , Edicions 62, Barcelona, 2000. .
 , Pòrtic, Barcelona, 2000. . 
 , Rafael Dalmau, Barcelona, 2000 (with V. Hurtado). .
 , Rafael Dalmau, Barcelona, 2001 (with V. Hurtado). .
 , IEI, Lleida, 2001. .
 , Lleida, 2002 (editor). .
 , Barcelona, 2004. .
 , Rafael Dalmau, Barcelona, 2004 (with V. Hurtado). .
 , Rafael Dalmau, Barcelona, 2006 (with V. Hurtado). .
 , Fundació Noguera, Barcelona, 2006. .
 , IV (2007), Universitat de Lleida, Lleida, 2007 (editor). .
 . Pagès editors - Ajuntament de Lleida, Lleida, 2008.  
 , Rafael Dalmau editor, Barcelona, 2009 (with V. Hurtado). .

External links
Departament d'Història de la Universitat de Lleida 
Arqueologia del paisatge de Catalunya 
Cartografia i història medieval a Catalunya 
Pobles de sagrera: poblacions eclesials medievals 
Les vilanoves: pobles nous medievals 
https://jordibolos.academia.edu/

1955 births
Living people
Historians of Europe
Spanish medievalists
People from Barcelona